Essential Pebbles, Volume 3 is a compilation album in the Essential Pebbles series.  Since the last album in the Pebbles series was released in 2007, this is likely to be the last volume in the Essential Pebbles series.  Although the album is subtitled Still More Ultimate '66 garage classics!, not all of the recordings were originally released in 1966.

Release data
This album was released on AIP Records in 2000 as #AIP-1064.

Notes on the tracks
Both CDs feature recordings from continental European bands, all or most of which had previously been featured in the Continent Lashes Back sub-series within the Pebbles series.

Track listing

Disc 1

 Robert Hoeke Rhythm & Blues Group: "When People Talk"
 The Fun of It: "Drollery" – Rel. 1966
 The Phantoms: "Someday I'm Somebody" – Rel. 1965
 The Jets: "I Was So Glad"
 The Haigs: "Where to Run" – Rel. 1966
 The Jets: "Worker in the Night"
 The Lords: "Day after Day" – Rel. 1965
 The Counsellors: "I'll Be Your Man" – Rel. 1965
 The Golden Earrings: "Not to Find" – Rel. 1965
 The Lazy Bones: "I'm Driftin'" – Rel. 1967
 AB & C: "Vies"
 Danny & the Royal Strings: "Get Away"
 Slaves: "Shut Up"
 Jack & the Outlaws: "Step into My Heart" – Rel. 1965
 Meteors: "Anytime" – Rel. 1965
 Mad Sound: "To Masturbate" – Rel. 1968
 The Beatchers: "What'd I Say"
 The Tages: "Bloodhound"
 The Palmes: "Nazz Are Blue" (Jeff Beck) – Rel. 1967
 The Shakers: "Move out of My Mind"
 Baby Grandmothers: "Somebody Keeps Calling My Name"
 The Lee Kings: "Oriental Express"
 The Stringtones: "Ode to Rhythm & Blues"

Disc 2
 Sooner or Later: "This Hammer"
 Sooner or Later: "Night Time"
 The Melvins: "The Man down There"
 The Trappers: "Too Much Monkey Business"
 The Shakers: "Tracks Remain"
 The Fabulous Four: "438 S. Michigan Ave."
 The Shakers: "Who Will Buy These Wonderful Eyes"
 The Cads: "Call My Name" – Rel. 1966
 Los Comancheros: "It's So Right" – Rel. 1966
 The Dee Jays: "Striped Dreams" – Rel. 1967
 The Demons: "You" – Rel. 1964
 The Gents: "Honor Bright"
 The Dee Jays: "You Must Be Joking" – Rel. 1965
 The Flippers: "Louie Louie" (Richard Berry)
 The Bootjacks: "Stoned"
 The Ones: "Love of Mine" – Rel. 1967
 Drafi & His Magics: "I Don't Need that Kind of Loving"
 The Dukes: "I'm an Unskilled Worker"
 The Sevens: "Talk about Her"
 The Sevens: "Panam"
 Les Sauterelles: "No No No" – Rel. 1966
 The Countdowns: "Sex Maniac"
 The Sevens: "In God We Trust"
 The Sevens: "What Can I Do"
 Les Sauterelles: "Hong Kong"

Nederpop
Pebbles (series) albums
2000 compilation albums